Franz Leopold von Nádasdy auf Fogaras (1708–1783) was an Austrian Field Marshal, and Ban of Croatia.

Early life
Franz Leopold von Nádasdy auf Fogaras was born on 30 September 1708 in Radkersburg, Austria into a Hungarian family of old nobility. He was the son of Graf Franz and Gräfin Rosa von Schrattenbach.

References

Bibliography
Archenholz, J.W, The History of the Seven Years' War in Germany, translated by F. A. Catty, Francfort, (1843)
Schinzler, Adolf: Nádasdy, Franz Leopold Graf. In: General German Biography (ADB) Duncker & Humblot, Leipzig, Volume 23 (1886)

1708 births
1783 deaths
Franz Leopold
Generals of the Holy Roman Empire
Austrian generals
Bans of Croatia
Grand Crosses of the Military Order of Maria Theresa